Johann Burchard Freystein (18 April 1671 – 1 April 1718) was a German lawyer and hymn writer.

Life

Freystein was born in Weissenfels, the son of Samuel Adam Freystein, vice-chancellor of Duke August of Saxony, inspector of the Gymnasium of Weissenfels.

Johann Burchard Freyenstein studied at the University of Leipzig in law, mathematics, philosophy and architecture. He spent some time in Berlin and Halle. In 1695 he achieved his doctorate in law at the University of Jena. He then founded his own firm in Dresden. In 1703 he was counsellor in Gotha. In 1709, he returned as a counsellor of court and law in Dresden, where he died.

Freystein's religiosity was influenced by Philipp Jakob Spener.

Work
Freystein's hymn "Mache dich, mein Geist, bereit, wache, fleh und bete" can still be found in Protestant hymnals (ECG 261, Lutheran hymnal EC 387). Johann Sebastian Bach used it as the basis for his chorale cantata Mache dich, mein Geist, bereit, BWV 115.

External links 

 

Jurists from Saxony
German Protestant hymnwriters
1671 births
1718 deaths
Leipzig University alumni
18th-century German lawyers